Falcarinol (also known as carotatoxin or panaxynol) is a natural pesticide and fatty alcohol found in carrots (Daucus carota), red ginseng (Panax ginseng) and ivy. In carrots, it occurs in a concentration of approximately 2 mg/kg.  As a toxin, it protects roots from fungal diseases, such as liquorice rot that causes black spots on the roots during storage. The compound requires the freezing condition to maintain well because it is sensitive to light and heat.

Falcarinol was also credited for helping to prevent colon cancer.

Chemistry
Falcarinol is a polyyne with two carbon-carbon triple bonds and two double bonds. The double bond at the carbon 9 position has cis stereochemistry was introduced by the desaturation, which requires oxygen and NADPH (or NADH) cofactors, creates a bend in the molecule that prevent fatty acid from solidifying in oils and cellular membranes.

It is structurally related to the oenanthotoxin and cicutoxin.

Biological effects
Falcarinol is an irritant that can cause allergic reactions and contact dermatitis.  It was shown that falcarinol acts as a covalent cannabinoid receptor type 1 inverse agonist and blocks the effect of anandamide in keratinocytes, leading to pro-allergic effects in human skin. Normal consumption of carrots has no toxic effect in humans.

Biosynthesis
Starting with oleic acid (1), which possesses a cis double bond at the carbon 9 position from desaturation and a bound of phospholipids (-PL), a bifunctional desaturase/acetylnase system occurred with oxygen (a) to introduce the second cis double bond at the carbon 12 position to form linoleic acid (2). This step was then repeated to turn the cis double bond at the carbon 12 position into a triple bond (also called acetylenic bond) to form crepenynic acid (3). Crepenynic acid was reacted with oxygen (b) to form a second cis double bond at the carbon 14 position (conjugated position) leading to the formation of dehydrocrepenynic acid (4). Allylic isomerization (c) was responsible for the changes from the cis double bond at the carbon 14 position into the triple bond (5) and formation of the more favored trans (E) double bond at the carbon 17 position (6). Finally, after forming the intermediate (7) by decarboxylation (d), falcarinol (8) was produced by hydroxylation (e) at the carbon 16 position that introduced the R conformation to the system.

See also 
 Falcarindiol

References 

Plant toxins
Fungicides
Neurotoxins
Alkene derivatives
Secondary alcohols
Conjugated diynes